Androstenediol sulfate, also known as androst-5-ene-3β,17β-diol 3β-sulfate, is an endogenous, naturally occurring steroid and a urinary metabolites of androstenediol. It is a steroid sulfate which is formed from sulfation of androstenediol by steroid sulfotransferase and can be desulfated back into androstenediol by steroid sulfatase.

See also
 Steroid sulfate
 C19H30O5S

References

Androgen esters
Androstanes
Secondary alcohols
Human metabolites
Sulfate esters